Dominic Jordan Artis (born July 7, 1993) is an American professional basketball player for Cholet Basket of the LNB Pro A.

College career
Artis played NCAA Division I college basketball at the University of Oregon, with the Oregon Ducks, from 2012 to 2014. After his sophomore season, he and teammates Damyean Dotson and Brandon Austin were dismissed due to sexual assault allegations. The Lane County District Attorney did not charge them with a crime due to a lack of evidence and conflicting statements made by the alleged victim. He then played college basketball at the University of Texas at El Paso, with the UTEP Miners, from 2015 to 2017. As a senior, he averaged 15.0 points and 6.5 rebounds per game and was named to the Second-team All-Conference USA.

Professional career
On August 10, 2017, Artis signed with Czarni Słupsk of the Polish Basketball League. On January 10, 2018, he parted ways with Czarni Słupsk after averaging 15.2 points, 5.1 rebounds and 6.1 assists per game. Two days later he signed with Igokea for the rest of the 2017–18 season. He averaged 13 points and 5 assists per game. On August 3, 2018, Artis signed with VL Pesaro. On August 19, 2019, he has signed with Dąbrowa Górnicza of the Polish Basketball League.

On January 30, 2020, he signed with Cedevita Olimpija of the Premier A Slovenian Basketball League. In May 2020, Cedevita Olimpija parted ways with him.

On August 14, 2020, Artis moved to Greece and signed with Kolossos Rodou. He averaged 14.4 points, 5.5 assists, 4.8 rebounds, and 1.6 steals in the Greek Basket League.

On July 25, 2021, Artis signed with Cholet Basket of the LNB Pro A.

References

External links
RealGM profile
Ballers Abroad profile

1993 births
Living people
21st-century African-American sportspeople
ABA League players
African-American basketball players
American expatriate basketball people in Bosnia and Herzegovina
American expatriate basketball people in France
American expatriate basketball people in Italy
American expatriate basketball people in Poland
American expatriate basketball people in Slovenia
American men's basketball players
Basketball players from Oakland, California
Cholet Basket players
Czarni Słupsk players
Findlay Prep alumni
KK Cedevita Olimpija players
KK Igokea players
Kolossos Rodou B.C. players
Lega Basket Serie A players
MKS Dąbrowa Górnicza (basketball) players
Oregon Ducks men's basketball players
Point guards
UTEP Miners men's basketball players
Victoria Libertas Pallacanestro players